Catherine Anna Scimeca Roskam (born March 30, 1943) is an American prelate, who served as Suffragan Bishop of New York from 1996 till 2012.

Early life and career
Catherine Scimeca was born on March 30, 1943, in Hempstead, New York and was raised as a Roman Catholic. She studied at Middlebury College in Vermont, and later commenced her career as theater actress, playing a variety of roles, mainly Shakespearian. She also worked as a municipal case worker. In 1966, she married Philip Roskam, who was also a case worker.

She joined the Episcopal Church in 1974. She attended the General Theological Seminary and graduated in 1984. She was then ordained to the diaconate on June 9, 1984 and to the priesthood on December 20, 1984. Catherine worked closely with AIDS victims in New York City, before moving to San Francisco in 1989. While there, she became rector of Our Saviour in Mill Valley, California and in 1991 became priest-in-charge of Holy Innocents Church in San Francisco. None months later she became diocesan missioner for 24 congregations.

Bishop
On June 10, 1995, Roskam was elected on the third ballot as the Suffragan Bishop of New York. She was then consecrated on January 27, 1996 by Presiding Bishop Edmond L. Browning, in the Cathedral of St. John the Divine. Barbara Harris, Suffragan Bishop of Massachusetts, and Richard F. Grein, Bishop of New York, were co-consecrators. Roskam retired in 2012.

References

Women Anglican bishops
21st-century Anglican bishops in the United States
1943 births
Living people
Converts to Anglicanism from Roman Catholicism
People from Hempstead (town), New York
Middlebury College alumni
General Theological Seminary alumni
Episcopal bishops of New York